Central Garage is a census-designated place (CDP) in King William County, Virginia, United States. The population as of the 2010 census was 1,318.

Geography
The community is northwest of the center of King William County, around the junction of U.S. Route 360 and Virginia State Route 30. US 360 leads northeast  to Tappahannock and southwest  to Richmond, the state capital. VA 30 leads southeast  to King William, the county seat, and northwest  to U.S. Route 1 in Doswell.

References

Virginia Trend Report 2: State and Complete Places (Sub-state 2010 Census Data)

Virginia Department of Transportation-produced road map

Unincorporated communities in Virginia
Census-designated places in King William County, Virginia
Census-designated places in Virginia